Madhepura is a municipality in Madhepura district in the Indian state of Bihar. It stands at the centre of Kosi ravine, It was called Madhyapura- a place centrally situated which was subsequently transformed as Madhipura into present Madhepura. It is surrounded by Araria and Supaul districts in the north, Khagaria and Bhagalpur districts in the south, Purnia district in the east and Saharsa district in the West.

History
Madhepura is part of the Mithila region and the people here speak the Maithili language.
Mithila first gained prominence after being settled by Indo-Aryan peoples who established the Mithila Kingdom (also called Kingdom of the Videhas).
During the late Vedic period (c. 1100–500 BCE), Videha became one of the major political and cultural centers of South Asia, along with Kuru and Pañcāla. The kings of the Videha Kingdom were called Janakas.
The Videha Kingdom was later incorporated into the Vajjika League, which had its capital in the city of Vaishali, which is also in Mithila.

Demographics
 India census, Madhepura had a population of 45,015. Males constitute 55% of the population and females 45%. Madhepura has an average literacy rate of 62%, higher than the national average of 59.5%: male literacy is 71%, and female literacy is 51%. In Madhepura, 15% of the population is under 6 years of age.

Transport
Public and private bus and taxi services are available.

Rail
Dauram Madhepura railway station is situated on Barauni-Katihar, Saharsa and Purnia sections and Barauni-Guwahati line.

Road
 and  passes through Madhepura. NH-231 goes through Purnia, Saharsa & Maheskhunt, while NH-131 goes through Birpur and Bihpur. There is daily bus service to Purnia, Saharsa, Supaul, Darbhanga & Patna.

Air
Nearest airport is Darbhanga Airport, Darbhanga. (140  km)

Madhepura To Darbhanga

Educational institution 
 Bhupendra Narayan Mandal University
B. P. Mandal College of Engineering, Madhepura
Jannayak Karpoori Thakur Medical college, Madhepura 
Polytechnic college Kalasan Chausa, Madhepura 
 Swami Vivekanand Vidyapith
 JNV madhepura
 T. P. College
 P.Sc. College
 Commerce College
 Madhepura College
 C.M.Sc College
 R.P.M. College
 BAS School MADHEPURA
 Shiv Nandan Prasad Mandal High School,
 Keshav Kanya High School,
 Rash Bihari High School
 Maya Vidya Niketan
 Swami Vivekananda Inter College 
 Holy Cross School
 Kiran Public School, Holy angels
 Wisdom Public School
 Madhepura Public School
 St.Johns Public School
 K.P.College Murliganj
 B.L.High School Murliganj
 Parasmani High School Babu Babhni
 Govt. High School Amari Murliganj Madhepura
 Govt. High school Kalasan chausa
 M.M. High School Kumarkhand
 Project Kanya High school Kumarkhand
 Durgapur, Bhddhi, Manguwar
 Ved Vyas Inter College Amleshwar Nagar Madhepura
 Ved Vyas Degree College Amleshwar Nagar Madhepura
 B.S.College Singheshwar Madhepura
 M.H.High School Rani Pokhar Madhepura 
 Kolte Computer pvt. ltd. (KYP Center)
 Surendra public school, Laxmipur Bhagwati-10, Kumarkhand, Madhepura
 S.B.J.S. High School, udakishunganj, Madhepura
 Kanya madhya vidhalaya, udakishunganj, Madhepur
 Hansi mandal college, Bihari ganj, Madhepura
 Sitaram Bal Vidya Niketan Ararghat, Gwalpara
 Williams School, Madhepura
 Jitendra Public School, Madhepura

See also
 Madhepura (Community development block)

References

Cities and towns in Madhepura district
 
Places in the Ramayana